Abinoam (a-bin'-o-am, ab-i-no'-am), from Kedesh-naphtali, was the father of Barak   who defeated Jabin's army, led by Sisera. He is mentioned only in Judges 4:6, 4:12 and 5:12.

The name means "the (divine) father is pleasantness or Father of Kindness"  Where the Masoretic Text of the Hebrew Bible reads Avinoam, the Greek Septuagint manuscripts read Ab[e]ineem or Iabin.

References

Book of Judges people